Deric Yaussi (born August 13, 1983) is a former American football placekicker who attended Wyoming. He is the son of Carol and Randy Yaussi. He now is a kicking coach and currently runs his own kicking camp.

Wyoming
Deric played under head coach Joe Glenn.

2002
As a true freshman, Yaussi played in three games. However, he did not attempt any field goals or extra points but performed kickoff duties in the three games he played. He earned his first varsity letter.

2003
In 2003, he led the Mountain West Conference in point-after touchdown percentage hitting 97.1%. He was also ranked No. 5 in the league for field-goal percentage. Yaussi earned Honorable Mention All-MWC honors as a sophomore.

2004
Yaussi was selected the First Team All-MWC place kicker as a junior. Yaussi was named MWC Special Teams Player of the Week versus San Diego State on October 9, 2004.

2005
During the 2005 season he was in the running for the Lou Groza Award. He played in the 2006 Senior Bowl.

Pro career
Yaussi went undrafted in the 2006 NFL Draft. He tried out for the Buffalo Bills and was later cut. In 2007, he was a member of the Colorado Ice. In 2008, Yaussi replaced injured kicker Clay Rush for the Colorado Crush.

References

Wyoming Cowboys football players
Living people
American football placekickers
Colorado Crush (IFL) players
Colorado Crush players
1983 births